Lindelöf is a surname of Swedish origin which may refer to:

People
Bernt Lindelöf, Swedish sprint canoeist who competed in the 1968 Summer Olympics
Damon Lindelof, American television writer, executive producer and screenwriter, co-creator of the TV series Lost
Ernst Leonard Lindelöf (1870–1946), Finnish mathematician and topologist 
Henri Lindelöf, Swedish sprint canoeist who competed in the late 1950s
Victor Lindelöf, Swedish international footballer

Other
Lindelöf hypothesis, a mathematical conjecture   
Lindelöf's lemma, a mathematical terminology in topology 
Lindelöf space, a mathematical property of topological spaces
Lindelöf's theorem, a mathematical theorem within complex analysis 
Phragmén–Lindelöf principle, a mathematical principle 
Picard–Lindelöf theorem, a mathematical theorem in the study of differential equations
1407 Lindelöf, a main belt asteroid with an orbital period of 1676.6949325 days

Surnames
Swedish-language surnames